TVMost is a Hong Kong online video platform established by Most Kwai Chung, the company which also runs Hong Kong magazine 100Most.  It aims to upload numbers of sarcastic videos for Hong Kong citizens in a daily matter, so the public can realize the latest events happening in Hong Kong in an entertaining way. Its slogan is "Do our best instead of not having a TV license issued by the Government".

Background 
TVMost is built up by Roy Tsui, the founder of the magazine Black Paper, 100Most and the publication house White Paper on May 18, 2015. It offers various programmes such as news, variety show and documentary online uploaded in an irregular basis. In addition, latest videos were posted to related social media sites, such as their official Facebook page, Instagram account and website. TVMost also welcomes advertisements in iMedia formats and co-op projects from advertisers for the sake of creating advertorial videos and promote the products in a humorous way.

Style 
The style of programmes in TVMost is features plenty of satire and humour, which is similar to the magazine of its parent company 100Most, with editorials reported in a funny and sarcastic style.  As their programmes make fun of the Hong Kong Government and controversial social issues by covering the hottest and most recent topic in Hong Kong, it resonates with the audience that abhors the power establishment in the city.  Famous local celebrities such as Gloria Yip, Gregory Wong and Akina Fong often act as special guests in the shows, especially in ‘Most News’ and ‘Ging Cook Gum Cook’, which further attracts audience's attention.

The duration of these programmes are mostly around a few minutes, probably less than 10. The founder of TVMost, Roy Tsui explained that people nowadays are busier and have shorter attention span. Therefore, their programmes will be tailor-made to cater the taste and pace of local dwellers, which turns out to be a great success.

Programmes

News

Most News (六點半左右新聞報導) 
Most News is targeted to provide daily news reports to audience in a more vivid way than other TV channels do. There are eight reporters in this news programme, whose names are retrieved from public figures and modified to become ironic or humorous jokes so as to enhance the programme's funniness. Titles of the daily news report are presented in an entertaining way to catch audience's attention as well. Broadcast on every Monday to Friday evenings.

Variety

Funny Choice (明張目膽 fun fun選) 
Parody of the same session of TVB's informative show 'Scoop'.  Hosted by On But Chuen, this variety show is divided into two parts. First, question and answer session (mainly in multiple choice format); second, prize giving session. This is the only programme that provides chances for audience to participate in TVMost's events because they may submit their answers through the Internet. The programme is known for providing comic relief to audience as well as arising their awareness about the controversial issues in Hong Kong, as the host often tells sardonic jokes.

Ging Cook Gum Cook (勁曲金曲) 
A weekly billboard programme which is a satirical take on TVB’s music programme Jade Solid Gold parodying real songs whilst poking fun at and raising concerns about social issues. A song that has been on the billboard since the show started is 'Forever ATV' by Gregory Charles Rivers, a play on famous singer Jacky Cheung Hok-yau’s 'Forever Love'. It jabbed at ATV’s tendency to rebroadcast decades-old programmes rather than making new ones and its delay to paystaff wages.   Famous singers in Hong Kong such as Gloria Yip, Hanjin Tan has been invited to film this show.

Documentary

Wednesday Report (星期三港案) 
A five-minute mini documentary narrated by Stephen Chan Chi-wan, mainly interviewing people in Hong Kong that do great things or make great influence to the society.  Interviewees in the previous episodes include the first transsexual women in Hong Kong advocating issues related to LGBT, an ordinary resident in Hong Kong that came out to be a candidate in the District Council election 2015 to fight against the pro-establishment camp.  Compared with other programmes produced by TVMost, the tone of Wednesday Report is more formal and serious. It airs every Wednesday.

Featured

TVMost Ten Big Ging Cook Gum Cook Award Distribution (毛記電視第一屆十大勁曲金曲分獎典禮) 

It was held on 11 January 2016 at Queen Elizabeth Stadium, which targeted in making fun of the local music industry's establishment and honouring artistes that paid much effort in making music.  It served as an extension of the TV programme ‘Ging Cook Gum Cook’, as the awarded songs were re-composed popular songs with ironic contents. Sponsored by Shell (Hong Kong) Limited and Gatsby Hong Kong. Some celebrities were invited to attend the ceremony, including Gregory Wong, Stephanie Cheng and Denise Ho. ‘Forever ATV’ sung by Gregory Charles Rivers was awarded the 'Best Song'. A total of 19 awards were distributed in the show.

Live broadcast was arranged on Now TV Channel 100. The entire ceremony was later archived on TVMost's official website.

Happy TVMost Birthday To Me (萬千呃Like賀台慶) 
An anniversary show of TVMost to be held on 11 May 2015 at the Hong Kong Convention and Exhibition Centre. Sponsored by Pricerite Hong Kong.

Artistes

The casting list of TVMost consists of 29 artistes. Most of them are fictional characters alluding the news anchors and artistes in TVB. For example:
 Tung Fong Shing (Alluding TVB news anchor Anthony Fong Tung Shing, original name: Wong Ka Wai)
 Chiu Hoi Chu (Alluding former TVB news anchor Alison Chiu Hoi Chu, original name: Kiki Tam)
 Ng Ling Chun (Alluding TVB news anchor Kenneth Ng King Chun)
 Chin Kam Lok (Alluding TVB artist Chin Ka Lok, original name: Wong Ka Wai)
 Chui Kin Mong (Alluding TVB host Amigo Choi, original name: Kyle Wong aka Ah Ho)
 Dickson (Alluding Dicky, the guest on TVB finance programme ‘Money Smart’, original name: Yuen Man Tai Ivan)
 Poon Choi Ying Tsz (Alluding former TVB news anchor Julia Poon Tsui Ying, original name: Or Tsui Ting Christy)
 Chow Ka Yim (Alluding former TVB news anchor Chow Ka Yee Venus)
 Wong Cham Ying (Alluding former TVB news anchor Wong Tsz Ying Connie, original name: Jessica Lee)
 Lee Kwan Ngar (Alluding former TVB news anchor Nabela Qoser, original name: Chan Pak Ling Mavis)
 55555 Ka Him (Alluding former TVB news anchor Ng Ka Him Vince, original name: Siu Wai)
 Law Yuek Off (Alluding TVB news anchor Law Yuek On Yvonne, original name: Mandi Cheuk)

Facilities

The headquarters of TVMost is located at Tung Chun Industrial Building, Kwai Chung. It is a small flat equipped with an indoor and outdoor multi-purpose production studios. Together served as the editorial office of its parent company 100Most.

See also 

 100Most

References 

2015 establishments in Hong Kong
Television stations in Hong Kong
Internet television channels
Television channels and stations established in 2015
Most Kwai Chung